Denipitiya Vithanage Sumana Amarasinghe (21 February 1948 – 5 June 2022) was an actress in Sri Lankan cinema and television. Highly versatile actress from drama to comedy, she is usually known as the Sweet girl in Sinhala cinema. Apart from acting, she also worked as an assistant director, production manager, costume designer as well as a producer. She was also the only actress to contribute to the production, singing, co-directing and co-editing of Sri Lankan cinema.

Personal life
Sumana was born on 21 February 1948 in Ranawana, Katugastota, Kandy, Sri Lanka, as the second child in a family with six siblings. Her father worked in the Inland Revenue Department. Since her family could not stay in Kandy, they came to Colombo and stayed in a rented house in Mt. Lavinia. She first went to the Mount Lavinia Buddhist Girls' College and later to Kalubowila Buddhaghosha Maha Vidyalaya. She has one sister and four brothers.

Amarasinghe was married to Roy de Silva, who was also a renowned actor and director. She met de Silva during the 1969 film Hathara Peraliya. The wedding was celebrated on 30 August 1975. The couple had two children. De Silva died on 30 June 2018 while treated for a heart attack at Sri Jayawardenepura General Hospital. His remains were buried on 2 July 2018 at Borella Cemetery.

In 2014, Amarasinghe was admitted to the hospital due to sudden illness. During her tour to India for a film, she is known to have had a drink which contained a poison. It has affected her liver as well as her heart. At one point her heart even stopped. This germ has not entered her brain and she recovered slowly. She worked at her own beauty shop, Salon Sumana. 
As a livelihood, she ran 'Salon Sumana' beauty salons in all three cities, Moratuwa, Thalahena and Rajagiriya. Then all this had to be closed due to she could not stay in the salon and a lot of problems arose. All three salons closed during Roy's lifetime. 

Amarasinghe died on 5 June 2022 at the age of 74 while receiving treatment at the Sri Jayewardenepura Hospital due to a sudden illness.

Acting career
She contested the beauty pageant "Lassana Muhuna", while she was in school times and won the title. Then she acted in the film Hathara Peraliya directed by L.M. Perera. Her maiden cinematic experience came through 1967 film Pipena Kumudu, directed by Ruby de Mel. Her father allowed Sumana to go only for that movie due to Ruby de Mel. However, she lied to her father and later played a lot of other movies such as Rena Giraw, Dahasak Sithuvili, Samanala Kumariyo and Hathara Peraliya.

In addition to acting, she was involved in the beauty industry, where she learned beauty courses in India, Singapore, Canada in 1980. Her first major breakthrough came through 1975 film Sukiri Kella, which earned her nickname "Sweet girl in Sinhala cinema".

She acted in a few films with her real husband, which made a cult in Sinhala cinema. Then she joined Tissa Wijesurendra in many popular films screened for more than 100 days which include Sudu Paraviyo and Sithaka Suwanda. In 1982, she acted in Kadawunu Poronduwa remake, where she acted the role previously acted by Rukmani Devi. Even though she started film career with dramatic roles, she turned to comedy roles in later stages particularly through films directed by her husband. Some of her popular films are Binaramalee, Sunethra, Jonsun and Gonsun and Re Daniel Dawal Migel trilogy.

After the July 1983 riots, many producers left the film industry, however Sumana contributed to the production of films such as Tom Pachayā, Thaṇa Giravi, Sudu Piruvaṭa and Jonsan hā Gonsan. In addition, she has been a Production Executive, Line Producer, Local Coordinator, Singer, Editor, Assistant, Hairstylist and Costume Designer. She excelled in her artistic career and was one of the pioneers in founding the corporation "Hela Nalu Nili Coalition" in 1969 and fought for the establishment of a state corporation for the film industry for the manifesto of Sirimavo Bandaranaike's policies in the 1970 general election.

Filmography

As actress

As producer

Awards

Sarasaviya Awards

|-
|| 1970 ||| Binaramalee || Merit Award || 
|}

Signis OCIC Awards

|-
|| 2018 ||| Contribution to the cinema || International Felicitation Award || 
|}

Sumathi Awards

|-
|| 2019 ||| Contribution to the cinema || U.W. Sumathipala Awards || 
|}

References

External links
 Sumana Amarasinghe on Sinhala Cinema Database
 රිදී තිරයේදී ගාමිණීට මගහැරුණු සුමනා

1948 births
2022 deaths
Sri Lankan film actresses
Actors from Kandy
20th-century Sri Lankan actresses
21st-century Sri Lankan actresses